Lugano Trophy, set up in 1961 at the occasion of the first edition of the IAAF World Race Walking Cup, so in the Lugano 1961 edition, represented the team rankings that combined the 20 km race walk and 50 km race walk events. It was held until 1997 and since 1993 two different team rankings were drawn for 20 km and for 50 km, so for three editions (1993, 1995 and 1997), three titles were assigned for team race.

Podium
Until 1985, the first 4 classifieds of each nation were ranked for team ranking since 1987. In any case, the medals were awarded to the participants, although they did not finish the race.

See also
IAAF World Race Walking Cup
Memorial Mario Albisetti

References

External links
IAAF World Race Walking Team Championships